Maria Frances Fahey (born 5 March 1984) is a New Zealand former cricketer who played as a left-handed batter. She appeared in 2 Test matches, 54 One Day Internationals and 8 Twenty20 Internationals for New Zealand between 2003 and 2010. She played domestic cricket for Canterbury.

Fahey was a member of the highly successful Timaru Girls' High School team during the late 1990s, and was part of the New Zealand Cricket Academy in 2002.  Her first international tour, that of India in 2003, saw her average over 50 with the bat, making three half-centuries in the process. She is current coach of ACA Cricket Academy in Guntur, Andhra Pradesh.

References

External links

 
 

1984 births
Living people
Cricketers from Timaru
New Zealand women cricketers
New Zealand women Test cricketers
New Zealand women One Day International cricketers
New Zealand women Twenty20 International cricketers
Canterbury Magicians cricketers
People educated at Timaru Girls' High School